WZFT (104.3 FM), known on-air as "Z104.3", is a Top 40 (CHR) radio station located in Baltimore, Maryland.  It is currently owned and operated by iHeartMedia.  Its studios are located at The Rotunda shopping center in Baltimore, and the transmitter is based atop Television Hill in the city's Woodberry district.

History

WITH-FM/DJ-104
104.3 signed on in 1949 as WITH-FM, the FM sister to WITH (1230 AM, now WRBS). WITH-FM was Maryland's pioneer FM station, with local legend Jack Wells serving as its first announcer.

In the 1970s, WITH-FM became Top 40 WDJQ-FM "DJ-104". By the late 1970s, WDJQ-FM made an attempt to do an all-Disco format, which failed in the ratings, and the station went back to Top 40 at the end of 1979.

B-104
In June 1980, Scripps-Howard Broadcasting acquired WDJQ-FM, and at Noon on July 2, 104.3 FM became WBSB under the handle "B-104", but retaining the previous Top 40 format. "B-104" was one of Baltimore's top-rated FM stations during the 1980s, and was home to "Brian and O'Brien", one of Baltimore's most notable morning drive time shows. Radio and TV personalities Glenn Beck and Pat Gray hosted a show on WBSB for several years in the late 1980s and early 1990s. Other notable air personalities included Ken Merson (The Merson Person), Willie B., Gary Murphy, Sean Hall, Tom Gilligan, Kris Earl Phillips, Ann Duran, J.R. Russ, Lisa Kay, “Downtown” Billy Brown and Brian Carter.

Variety 104.3/Soft 104.3
In the early 1990s, Top 40 radio suffered a decline in audience and revenue due to the rise of alternative rock and hip hop. Many stations around the country flipped to other formats; WBSB was one of those. On February 18, 1992, at 9:00 a.m., after playing a montage of station memories, the station flipped to "Variety 104.3", a Hot AC competitor to WWMX, which was a mainstream AC at the time. The first song on "Variety" was "Listen to the Music" by The Doobie Brothers. In January 1993, the station changed its call letters to WVRT. The station suffered from low ratings during this time. Ironically, Capitol Broadcasting, the owners of WWMX, bought the station from E. W. Scripps in the Fall of 1993. On December 13, the station began stunting with a simulcast of WWMX. At Midnight on December 20, the stunting switched to a one song per day loop, as well as liners redirecting listeners to WWMX. Finally, on January 12, 1994, at 6 p.m., the station flipped to "Soft 104.3" WSSF, a soft AC competing with well-established WLIF. Capitol sold the station to American Radio Systems in 1994.

104.3 The Colt/104.3-OCT
After just 9 months of "Soft", on October 14, 1994, at 3 p.m., the station flipped to '70s-based classic hits as "104.3 The Colt", using the call letters WOCT. The first song on "The Colt" was Bachman–Turner Overdrive's "You Ain't Seen Nothing Yet". The station later evolved into a classic rock format. In 1998, American Radio Systems merged with CBS Radio/Infinity Broadcasting. The company was forced to sell one station due to being over the ownership limitations of 5 FM stations in a market. As a result, WOCT was sold to Jacor Communications, which would merge with the station's current owner iHeartMedia (then known as Clear Channel Communications) a year later. Following the sale, the station changed its format again, this time to a harder classic rock format as "104.3-OCT."

Baltimore 104.3/B-104.3
In 2001, the station returned to mainstream classic rock as "Baltimore 104.3", and then a year later briefly brought back the heritage "B-104" name as WXFB ("B-104.3").

Smooth Jazz 104.3/Channel 104.3
On September 5, 2003, at 10 a.m., the station flipped to Smooth Jazz as WSMJ. During WSMJ's (near) five-year run, it was nominated by the Radio & Records Industry for "Smooth Jazz Station of the Year" in 2005, as well as, one nomination and one win for "Program Director of the Year" in 2005 and 2007.

On May 23, 2008, at 9 a.m., after playing Neither One of Us (Wants to Be the First to Say Goodbye) by Gladys Knight & the Pips, the station began stunting with Christmas music.  At Noon the same day, the station launched into a 1990s-intensive modern rock format similar to other Clear Channel modern rockers in Grand Rapids, Michigan, Philadelphia, and Hartford, Connecticut as Channel 104.3. The first (and ultimately, last) song on "Channel" was "No Way Back" by The Foo Fighters. On May 29, 2008, the station changed its call letters to WCHH. The WCHH call letters were last used in 2003 by an Urban Contemporary station in Charlotte, North Carolina.

In January 2009, the transmitter was moved from northeast of the city to Television Hill near downtown, with hopes of improving signal coverage in the Howard and Anne Arundel County suburbs.

Z104.3

At 10 a.m. on November 4, 2009, the station briefly stunted again, this time with R&B music as "Charm 104.3", before officially flipping to Top 40 at Noon as "Z104.3". The first song played on "Z" was 3 by Britney Spears. The station changed calls to WZFT on November 20, 2009. The debut of "Z104.3" marked the first time that Baltimore had a Top 40 station since 2001, when WXYV flipped to mainstream urban, and also brought the CHR format back to 104.3 FM after a 17 year absence. Hot AC-formatted WWMX-FM, a former sister station now owned by Entercom, had been leaning towards a Mainstream Top 40 direction beginning the preceding year to try and fill that void. On July 1, 2014, WZFT updated its logo, mirroring a logo similar to sister station WHTZ in New York.

HD Radio
On June 26, 2019, WZFT-HD2 flipped to iHeart's "Pride Radio" format of Top 40/Dance music targeting the LGBTQ community. Previously, the HD2 subchannel carried hip-hop music as "The Beat", urban AC music from iHeart's "All My Jams" channel, and alternative rock as "Alt 104.3".

References

External links
Official website
Live stream
https://www.facebook.com/z1043
https://twitter.com/z1043

WBSB 1990 audio clip
WSMJ becomes WCHH
FMQB 11/4/2009 Z104.3 Launch Article

Contemporary hit radio stations in the United States
ZFT
Radio stations established in 1945
1945 establishments in Maryland
IHeartMedia radio stations